Łuków may refer to the following places:
 Łuków in Lublin Voivodeship (east Poland)
 Łuków, Lubusz Voivodeship (west Poland)
 Łuków, Silesian Voivodeship (south Poland)
 Lukiv (Łuków), Polish name for the municipality in Ukraine
 Luckau (Łuków}, Sorbian name for the municipality in Germany